Vladimir Litvinenko (born 1 June 1989) is a Russian sledge hockey player. In the 2014 Winter Paralympics, he won the silver medal in the men's sledge hockey tournament with Russia.

References

External links 
 

1989 births
Living people
Russian sledge hockey players
Paralympic sledge hockey players of Russia
Paralympic silver medalists for Russia
Ice sledge hockey players at the 2014 Winter Paralympics
Medalists at the 2014 Winter Paralympics
Paralympic medalists in sledge hockey
21st-century Russian people